Harold Le Roy McKain (July 10, 1906 – January 24, 1970) was a Major League Baseball pitcher who played for five seasons. He played for the Cleveland Indians in 1927 and the Chicago White Sox from 1929 to 1932.

External links

1906 births
1970 deaths
Major League Baseball pitchers
Cleveland Indians players
Baseball players from Iowa
Chicago White Sox players
American expatriate baseball players in Canada
Dallas Steers players
Decatur Commodores players
Omaha Packers players
Toronto Maple Leafs (International League) players
Waterloo Hawks (baseball) players